Ten Readings of a Warning is the first album by All Smiles. It was released on Dangerbird Records on April 24, 2007.

Track listing
All songs written by Jim Fairchild.
 "Early Man" – 0:37
 "Summer Stay" – 3:39
 "Killing Sheep" – 3:33
 "Pile of Burning Leaves" – 3:56
 "The Velvetest Balloon" – 2:24
 "Moth in a Cloud of Smoke" – 3:46
 "I Know It's Wrong" – 3:57
 "Leave Love" – 3:54
 "Backward Forward Through" – 3:59
 "Sprinting Hyphens" – 3:32
 "Of Course It's Not Up to Me" – 4:54

Release Information
Dangerbird Records - All Smiles - Ten Readings of a Warning

External links
Ten Readings of a Warning - on Rdio
Ten Readings of a Warning - on Spotify

2007 albums